In boating, P-class could refer to either of: 

 a development class for racing yachts under the Universal Rule devised in 1902 by Nathanael Herreshoff for America's Cup racing
 a class of sailing dinghy developed in New Zealand in 1923 by Harry Highet